Lieutenant General Sir Bertie Drew Burdett Fisher, KCB, CMG, DSO (13 July 1878 – 24 July 1972) was a British Army general during the Second World War.

Military career
Fisher was commissioned into the 17th Lancers as second lieutenant on 23 May 1900, and served in the Second Boer War, during which he was promoted to lieutenant on 29 July 1901. Following the end of the war, he returned from Cape Town to England in the SS Maplemore in August 1902.

He went to the Staff College in 1911. In 1913 he learned to fly and became a General Staff Officer in the Military Aeronautics Department at the War Office.

He served in World War I initially as a brigade major in the 6th Cavalry Brigade, which formed part of the British Expeditionary Force and then as a General Staff Officer in 1st Cavalry Division. He was appointed commanding officer of the Leicestershire Yeomanry in 1915 and the commander of the 8th Infantry Brigade in 1918.

After the war, he was the commander of the 17th Lancers at the time of their amalgamation with the 21st Lancers in 1922.

He took command of the 2nd Cavalry Brigade in 1923 and was the commandant of the Senior Officer School in 1927. He was then a Brigadier on the General Staff at Aldershot Command from 1930 and Director Recruiting and Organisation at the War Office from 1932. He became Commandant of the Royal Military College Sandhurst in 1934 and retired in 1938.

He was recalled from retirement during the Second World War to be General Officer Commanding-in-Chief for Southern Command from 1939 to 1940, when he retired again.

He lived in Basingstoke in Hampshire.

Family
He married Majorie Frances Boyd; they had two sons.

References

Bibliography

External links
Generals of World War II

|-
 

1878 births
1972 deaths
British Army lieutenant generals
British Army personnel of the Second Boer War
British Army generals of World War II
Knights Commander of the Order of the Bath
Companions of the Order of St Michael and St George
Companions of the Distinguished Service Order
17th Lancers officers
Leicestershire Yeomanry officers
Commandants of Sandhurst
British Army cavalry generals of World War I
Graduates of the Staff College, Camberley
Commandants of the Senior Officers' School, Sheerness